Alcántara is a municipality in the province of Cáceres, Extremadura, Spain, on the Tagus, near Portugal. The toponym is from the Arabic word al-Qanṭarah (القنطرة) meaning "the bridge".

History
Archaeological findings have attested human presence in the area from the Bronze Age; the first historical inhabitants were the Lusitanians, followed by the Celts, who came from east to the Pyrenees. To this period, and to the following Roman domination, belong remains of several castra (military camps), villas and the bridge which gives its name to the city. The Roman rule lasted from the 2nd century BC to the 5th century, when they were replaced by the Visigoths.

In the 8th century, the Moors conquered the Iberian Peninsula and called it Al-Andalus, ending four centuries of Visigothic presence in what is now Spain, France, Portugal and Gibraltar. In the 12th century the Muslim geographer al-Idrisi described the bridge as one of the world's marvels. In the 12th-13th centuries Alcántara was a frontier city, devoted to military activities and animal husbandry. After the collapse of the  Caliphate of Córdoba, it belonged to several Islamic taifas (petty kingdoms).

Ferdinand II of León liberated it in 1167, during his wars against Portugal, but later the town was recaptured by the Almohads. The Christians conquered it indefinitely in 1213 with Alfonso IX of León. In 1217 it was given to the military order of Calatrava. They however considered it too difficult to defend, and thus the following year they were replaced by the Order of San Julian de Pereiro, a military order created in 1156 and which had its headquarters on the Rio Cora and which later took its name from Alcántara, where they established. The city maintained its strategical importance until 1655. In 1807, during the Peninsular War, it was occupied by the French troops.

Alcántara lost all its importance in the 19th century, when the order's properties were secularized. Its depopulation was halted only in the 1960s, when the electric company Hidroelectrica Espaňola built here several plants. However, its economy was not boosted, and the town is still part of one of the less developed areas of Spain.

The Order of Alcántara, a religious and military order, was established in 1176 here, for defence against the Moors, and was suppressed in 1835.

In 1499, Peter of Alcántara, teacher of Theresa of Ávila, saint and Franciscan reformer, was born here.

Main sights
Alcántara Bridge, of six symmetrical arches, 194 m long and 71 m high, built in honour of Trajan in 103-106. An inscription gives the name of the architect of the viaduct, C. Iulius Lacer.
Convent of San Benito de Alcántara (16th century)
Church of Holy Mother of Almocobar (13th century)
Remains of the Moorish walls, modified and restored in the Middle Ages
Convent of St. Francis (15th-17th centuries)
Convent of the Nuns of Los Remedios, of which only the Baroque Chapel remains

References

Richard Stillwell, ed. Princeton Encyclopedia of Classical Sites, 1976: "Alcántara, Cáceres, Spain"

External links 

 
 

Municipalities in the Province of Cáceres